My Dearest Darkest Neighbor is the fourth full-length album by New Orleans musical group Hurray for the Riff Raff. It was originally available only as a reward in a Kickstarter campaign to fund their previous album Look Out Mama, and in local record stores.  A version of George Harrison's "My Sweet Lord" was included in the new release. The album was released July 1, 2013 by Mod Mobilian Records and This Is American Music.

Track listing 
Delta Momma Blues (Townes Van Zandt) (3:48)
Fine and Mellow (Billie Holiday) (3:37)
My Morphine (Gillian Welch) (4:05)
Black Jack Davey (Traditional) (3:11)
Western Cowboy (Lead Belly) (4:42)
Jealous Guy (John Lennon) (3:27)
Just A Heart (James Hand) (3:34)
Angel Ballad (Alynda Lee Segarra, based on the Gillian Welch composition "Ruination Day") (6:06)
Cuckoo (Alynda Lee Segarra) (3:34)
People Talkin' (Lucinda Williams) (3:52)
River (Joni Mitchell) (4:48)
I'm Goin' Away (Elizabeth Cotten) (2:19)
I'm so Lonesome I Could Cry (Hank Williams) (4:34)
My Sweet Lord (George Harrison) (4:00)

Personnel 
Alynda Lee Segarra - vocals, guitar
Yosi Perlstein - fiddle, drums, percussion
Sam Doores - drums (#5), piano (#6), guitar (#14)
Dan Cutler - bass (#5, 14)
Zach Setchfield - slide guitar (#14)
Andy Wilhite - organ (#14)

References 

2013 albums
Hurray for the Riff Raff albums
Kickstarter-funded albums
Crowdfunded albums